Mayevka is a village in the Alamüdün District in Chüy Region of Kyrgyzstan. Its population was 10,535 in 2021. The village was established in 1930.

Population

References

Populated places in Chüy Region